Pogonia japonica, known as Asian pogonia, is a species of orchid occurring in East Asia.

The orchid is native to Japan, Korea, and China in the provinces of Anhui, Fujian, Guangxi, Guizhou, Heilongjiang, Hubei, Hunan, Jiangxi, Jilin, Inner Mongolia, Shandong, Sichuan, Yunnan, and Zhejiang.

It is found in grasslands on hilltops, forest edges along valleys, moist thickets, and open moist places.

References

External links 

japonica
Orchids of China
Orchids of Japan
Orchids of Korea
Flora of North Korea
Flora of South Korea
Flora of Anhui
Flora of Fujian
Flora of Guangxi
Flora of Guizhou
Flora of Heilongjiang
Flora of Hubei
Flora of Hunan
Flora of Jiangxi
Flora of Jilin
Flora of Inner Mongolia
Flora of Shandong
Flora of Sichuan
Flora of Yunnan
Flora of Zhejiang
Plants described in 1852